Paisius was the Greek Orthodox Patriarch of Alexandria between the years 1657 and 1678.

In 1665, the Patriarch of Constantinople Parthenios IV deposed him from his throne, citing his many years of absence from Egypt, but the decision was not accepted by the flock and with the help of Russian diplomacy he was reinstated.

As Patriarch, he went to Moscow at the invitation of Tsar Alexis. He appointed him as head of the Great Moscow Synod of 1666, which condemned the Patriarch of Moscow Nikon for dereliction of duty. He stayed in Russia for years and secured significant financial aid for the Patriarchate of Alexandria from the Tsar. After 1666, he wrote an account of the Synod's condemnation of Patriarch Nikon of Moscow in the form of a polemical essay in support of the absolute authority of the Russian Tsar in theological matters.

In 1678 he abdicated the Patriarchal Throne due to his advanced age. He was succeeded by Parthenius I of Alexandria.

References

17th-century Greek Patriarchs of Alexandria